Giant Spider may refer to:

Species 
Giant house spider, common to Europe
Giant wood spider,  or Golden silk orb-weaver, found worldwide

Mythology, folklore and fiction 
 Giant Spider (Middle Earth), also known as Great Spiders 
 Any depiction of oversized spider – see Cultural depictions of spiders, including:
 Some depictions of Anansi from African folklore
 Tsuchigumo, aka ōgumo (大蜘蛛, "giant spider"), a derogatory term and race of yōkai in Japanese folklore
 It (character) from novel of the same name
 Acromantulas from the novel series Harry Potter
 Giant spiders, a type of monster in Dungeons & Dragons role playing game

See also 
 The Giant Spider Invasion, a 1975 sci-fi film
 Big Ass Spider!, a 2013 sci-fi comedy horror film